The 1946 Sagaing earthquakes (also known as the Wuntho earthquakes) struck central Burma at 15:17 local time on 12 September. The first earthquake measured a magnitude of 7.3  and was followed by a 7.7  earthquake. Both events remain some of the largest in the country since the 1762 Arakan earthquake.

Tectonic setting 
Both the mainshock and aftershock occurred along the Sagaing Fault; a continental transform fault boundary that links the Andaman Spreading Center to the south and the Main Himalayan Thrust to the north. It defines the boundary between the Burma Plate and Sunda Plate. The Sagaing Fault is the most active geological structure in the country and poses significant risks to major cities such as Yangon, Mandalay, and Naypyidaw. Another major tectonic feature in Myanmar is the Sunda Megathrust that runs off the coast of Western Myanmar and the Kabaw Fault that traces the foothills of the Arakan Mountains and Indo-Burman Range.

Earthquakes 

The  7.3 earthquake ruptured along the Sagaing Fault. The latter earthquake ruptured along the Sagaing segment, through the villages of Tagaung and Thabeikkyin.

From observing the historical records of earthquakes, the years 1906 and 1908 saw two major events in the northernmost end of the Sagaing Fault. The 1906 Putao earthquake on August 31 had an estimated moment magnitude  of 7.0, and the 1908 earthquake measured  7.5. Coulomb stress transfer to the south from the 1906 quake triggered rupture of the fault in the stressed area in 1908.

The 1908 earthquake resulted in the accumulation of stress towards the south, where the future 1931  7.7 earthquake would take place. Similarly, the 1946 earthquake rupture segments were directly south of the 1931 rupture. The first mainshock in the 1946 doublet sequence then triggered the second mainshock due to the sudden increase in stress levels on the fault.

Ten years later, an  7.1 earthquake near Mandalay killed at least 40 people. That earthquake broke a  segment south of the 1946 rupture. In 1991, a seismic gap between the two 1946 ruptures generated an  7.0 earthquake, partially re-rupturing a  section of the 1946 ruptures. Another  6.8 earthquake in 2012 partially ruptured the Sagaing segment.

See also

List of earthquakes in 1946
List of earthquakes in Myanmar

References 

Earthquakes in Myanmar
1946 earthquakes
Doublet earthquakes
Strike-slip earthquakes
1946 in Burma